The Weinberg Center is a 1,143-seat theater building located in Frederick, Maryland. It holds various showings of music, theater, films, studio screenings, conventions, weddings, business meetings, television and commercial location shoots and visual arts.

History 
The theatre was built as the Tivoli Theatre by the Stanley-Crandall Company and opened on December 23, 1926. It was the premiere movie theatre of Frederick for nearly fifty years but closed after considerable damage suffered in a 1976 flood. The Weinberg family, which then owned the old movie palace, chose to present it to the city as a gift rather than attempt to keep it open as a movie house. The theatre has been maintained in the splendid style of 1926. The theatre's organ, a two-manual, eight-rank Wurlitzer, is the only original theatre organ installation in the state. The Weinberg Center holds several dozen events every year, and has an annual budget of one million dollars.

References

External links

 

Performing arts centers in Maryland
1926 establishments in Maryland
Tourist attractions in Frederick County, Maryland
Arts organizations established in 1926
Theatres completed in 1926
Buildings and structures in Frederick, Maryland
Public venues with a theatre organ